Martin Fowler (born 17 January 1957 in York) is an English former professional footballer who played in the Football League as a midfielder for Huddersfield Town, Blackburn Rovers, Hartlepool United, Stockport County and Scunthorpe United.

References

External links
 

1957 births
Living people
Footballers from York
English footballers
Association football midfielders
Huddersfield Town A.F.C. players
Blackburn Rovers F.C. players
Hartlepool United F.C. players
Stockport County F.C. players
Scunthorpe United F.C. players
English Football League players
Place of birth missing (living people)